POEMS may refer to:
Poetry
POEMS syndrome